Mount Tabor is a town in Rutland County, Vermont, United States. The population was 210 at the 2020 census.

Geography
Half of the unincorporated village of Danby is in the west part of town, along U.S. Route 7 on the west side of Otter Creek.

Demographics

As of the census of 2000, there were 203 people, 92 households, and 56 families residing in the town.  The population density was 4.6 people per square mile (1.8/km2).  There were 121 housing units at an average density of 2.8 per square mile (1.1/km2).  The racial makeup of the town was 99.51% White and 0.49% Native American.

There were 92 households, out of which 27.2% had children under the age of 18 living with them, 48.9% were married couples living together, 8.7% had a female householder with no husband present, and 39.1% were non-families. 35.9% of all households were made up of individuals, and 16.3% had someone living alone who was 65 years of age or older.  The average household size was 2.21 and the average family size was 2.80.

In the town, the population was spread out, with 21.7% under the age of 18, 3.4% from 18 to 24, 34.5% from 25 to 44, 26.1% from 45 to 64, and 14.3% who were 65 years of age or older.  The median age was 40 years. For every 100 females, there were 101.0 males.  For every 100 females age 18 and over, there were 98.8 males.

The median income for a household in the town was $32,250, and the median income for a family was $46,042. Males had a median income of $35,208 versus $20,938 for females. The per capita income for the town was $17,785.  About 7.3% of families and 10.6% of the population were below the poverty line, including 14.9% of those under the age of eighteen and none of those 65 or over.

Speed trap

References

 
Towns in Vermont
Towns in Rutland County, Vermont